Talento de Barrio is the soundtrack album to the film of the same name starring Puerto Rican reggaeton singer-songwriter Daddy Yankee, who also performs the songs on the album. It was released on August 12, 2008, by Machete Music and El Cartel Records, to accompany the motion picture Talento de Barrio. The album was mainly produced by reggaeton producers Eli El Musicólogo and Menes. The album production explores reggaeton with elements of tropical music such as merengue and dancehall along with EDM and electropop sounds. It receive positive reviews and was nominated for Best Urban Album at the 10th Annual Latin Grammy Awards. The album was supported by four official singles: "Somos de Calle", "Pose", "Llamado de Emergencia", and "Que Tengo Que Hacer?".

The album was a commercial success selling over one million of copies worldwide. In the United States, the album debut at the top of Billboard Top Latin Albums and received a double platinum (Latin Field) certification by the RIAA with an excess of 200,000 copies, platinum in Argentina and Central America. To promote de album, Yankee embarked in his third official world tour Talento de Barrio Tour. Following the success of the album, Daddy Yankee was named by CNN as the Most Influential Hispanic Artist of 2009 and was the most searched artist on Google in Argentina of 2009.

History

Promotion
Several songs, including "Sólido" and "Somos de Calle", were uploaded to Daddy Yankee's MySpace profile several months before the release of the soundtrack. Released as free single downloads at the time, were not announced to be included on the soundtrack until mid-Summer 2008, when promotion of the film Talento de Barrio would be disclosed. The planned musical style of the soundtrack would not be recognized until May 2008 when Daddy Yankee released the soundtrack's first single "Pose". The purpose for the soundtrack is to promote the film, A planned re-release, entitled Daddy Yankee Mundial, which later ended to be his next studio album.

Following the released of the album, Yankee embarked in a series of public and personal appearances, similar way of the previous promo cycle of El Cartel: The Big Boss. This include TV shows with large Hispanic audiences such as Don Francisco Presenta and El Show del Cristina. Some of the songs of the soundtrack such as "Somos de Calle" and "Pose", were included in the set list of the last leg of his Big Boss Tour. In October 2008, Daddy Yankee's cologne was started to sell on Macys and was promoted by TV ads accompany with the music of the lead single Pose. In the same way, in November 2008, Pose was air ABC's "Ugly Betty.

Musical style
The album has an overall urban-R&B vibe, and also has many different musical styles like dance music, salsa, bachata and reggaeton. Although all the songs on Talento de Barrio are different in music style, they all revolve around the same subjects of the film. Talento de Barrio [the film] relates the struggles young people face when they try to improve their lives and break free from their troubled surroundings.

Critical reception 
Talento de Barrio receive mostly positive reviews by critcs. Jason Birchmeier from AllMusic compared the album favorably with his previous album and stated " Talento de Barrio is an all-around better album than El Cartel: The Big Boss. Not only is it more stylistically consistent and more reasonably paced at 15 songs in less than an hour's time; most importantly, it sticks with what's already proven successful".

Commercial reception

Album 
In the United States, the album debut at the top of Billboard Latin Albums and Latin Rhythm Albums selling 26,000 copies in the first week. The soundtrack became a major debuting success on the Billboard 200, peaking at number 13. It dropped to number 23 the week after, and eventually to number 35. Its final charting position was at number 191, as of December 13, 2008. As of April 2009, it sold over 170,000 copies. Eventually, it was certified two times platinum (Latin Field) by RIAA for shipping over 200,000 copies in the United States. It also became entered in the Top 5 of the Billboard Top Soundtracks chart peaking at number 3, becoming Daddy Yankee's first Top 5 soundtrack on the Top Soundtracks chart. The soundtrack is also Yankee's fourth consecutive number-one album on the Billboard Top Latin Albums chart.

The album debut with 122,000 copies worldwide. The album was a commercial success across Latin American and was certified platinum in Argentina and Gold in Peru. In Argentina, the album debut and peaked at number 5. It was certified platinum for selling over 40,000 copies and was the 7th best selling album of 2009 in the country. In Central America, Talento de Barrio was certified gold for selling over 5,000 copies and 250,000 digital downloads in Central America. In Venezuela, it debut and peaked at number one of the retail album charts according to Recordland. It also, it peaked at number 28 in Mexico Album Charts and number 12 in Ecuador.

Singles
The lead single, "Pose", was released digitally via MySpace on May 14, 2008, and officially released to online music stores on the day of the album's release. It is the most successful charting single from the album, peaking at number 4 on the U.S. Billboard Hot Latin Songs chart in August 2008. "Pose" presents a mix of hip hop and dance, with Latin and African American rhythms. 

A promotional single, "Somos de Calle", was released as a radio promo in mid-Summer 2008. It was released online, along with its video. Though not as successful as the album's lead single, the song still gets video play on music video television networks, as well as minor airplay. The video, as well as the lyrics, is more like the film in subject matter.
The second single, "Llamado de Emergencia", was released on September 23, 2008. A vallenato-pop influenced track, the single made a modest debut at number 26 on the Billboard Hot Latin Songs chart, and has so far peaked at number 21.
The third single, "¿Qué Tengo Que Hacer?", was released on January 19, 2009. It has so far peaked at number 11 on the Billboard Latin Rhythm Airplay chart.

Track listing

Credits and personnel 

Credits adapted from the CD information, where Daddy Yankee is credited as Raymond Ayala instead of Ramón Ayala, and Los De La Nazza are credited as Los De La Nasa.

Charts

Album charts

Year-end charts

Sales and certifications

References

Daddy Yankee soundtracks
2008 soundtrack albums
Drama film soundtracks
Albums produced by Luny Tunes
Spanish-language soundtracks